Amherst is a township municipality in the Canadian province of Quebec, located within Les Laurentides Regional County Municipality.

The village of Vendée is also located within the municipality.

Demographics 

Population trend:
 Population in 2021: 1728 (2016 to 2021 population change: 16.4%)
 Population in 2016: 1484 
 Population in 2011: 1524 
 Population in 2006: 1421
 Population in 2001: 1214
 Population in 1996: 1145 (or 1169 when adjusted for 2001 boundaries)
 Population in 1991: 883

Private dwellings occupied by usual residents: 876 (total dwellings: 1613)

Mother tongue:
 English as first language: 4.9%
 French as first language: 92.5%
 English and French as first language: 1.4%
 Other as first language: 1.4%

Education

Sir Wilfrid Laurier School Board operates English-language schools:
 Arundel Elementary School in Arundel
 Sainte Agathe Academy (for high school only) in Sainte-Agathe-des-Monts

References

Township municipalities in Quebec
Incorporated places in Laurentides